Cloud One is the second studio album by New York City noise rock band Live Skull, released in 1986 by Homestead Records.

Track listing

Personnel 
Adapted from the Cloud One liner notes.

Live Skull
 Mark C. – guitar, vocals, photography
 Marnie Greenholz – bass guitar, vocals
 James Lo – drums
 Tom Paine – guitar, vocals

Production and additional personnel
 Martin Bisi – mixing, recording
 Live Skull – production, mixing, recording

Release history

References

External links 
 
 Cloud One at Bandcamp

1986 albums
Homestead Records albums
Live Skull albums